Guilford Center Cemetery is a historic cemetery at Guilford Center in Chenango County, New York. The cemetery contains approximately 427 burials, with 318 markers, Some are fallen or broken. The historical society's cemetery committee works hard to maintain the markers.  The earliest burial dates to 1809.

It was added to the National Register of Historic Places in 2005.

References

External links

 
 

Cemeteries on the National Register of Historic Places in New York (state)
Cemeteries in Chenango County, New York
National Register of Historic Places in Chenango County, New York